Rahime Perestu Sultan ("mercy" and "swallow";  1830 –  1906), also known as Rahime Perestu Kadın, was the first legal wife of Sultan Abdulmejid I of the Ottoman Empire. She was given the title and position of Valide sultan (Queen mother) when Abdul Hamid II, her adopted son, ascended the throne in 1876 making her the last valide sultan of the Ottoman Empire.

Early life
Of Circassian origin, Perestu was born in around 1830 in an Ubykh noble family. She had one sister, Mihrifidan Hanım (died 1865), who was the wife of Fazıl Bey, son of Yusuf Pasha.

Esma Sultan, the daughter of Sultan Abdul Hamid I lived in luxury in her magnificent villa in Istanbul, but still her life passed in sadness because she could not have the one thing she wished for most; a child. At length she decided to adopt a child. After reaching satisfactory terms with the mother and father, she adopted the child, one year of age. As Esma's daughter, she had an adoptive sister, Nazif Hanim, adopted by Esma too.

She was particularly diminutive, delicate and graceful, so she renamed her Perestu, the Persian word for swallow. All the kalfas in Esma Sultan's villa behaved toward this child as though she were a daughter of an Ottoman imperial princess, and indeed her disposition and manners were so lovely that they became devoted to her. Perestu was descrived as beautiful woman, possessing a petite and slender figure with translucent white skin, blue eyes, golden blonde hair, and truly lovely hands and feet. She had elegant and refined manners, was kindly, dignified and always spoke in a low voice, and had everyone's affection and respect.

Marriage

One spring day in 1844, Abdulmejid came to visit his aunt and was passing through the harem gardens when he saw Perestu, then fourteen years old. The chronicles say that he was so impressed with her that her aunt asked him if she was okay. 

He asked his aunt to give her hand in marriage to him. Firstly, Esma Sultan refused to give Perestu's hand in marriage but later consented, provided that Perestu became his legal wife and not a consort in concubinage. One week after that, Perestu was sent off to the Topkapı Palace and became Abdulmejid's first legal wife. 

She was given the title of "Senior Ikbal". In 1845, she was elevated to "Sixth Kadın", in 1851, to "Fifth Kadın", and in 1861, to "Fourth Kadın".

Perestu had no children of her own. In 1845, when Cemile Sultan's mother Düzdidil Kadın died leaving her motherless at age of two. Abdulmejid took her to Perestu, and entrusted her into her care. She also became the adoptive mother of Abdul Hamid II after the death of his own mother, Tirimüjgan Kadın in 1852. Thus, the two siblings grew up together in the same household and spent their childhoods with one another. 

After Abdulmejid's death in 1861, she settled in her villa in Maçka, Nişantaşı, which had been a gift presented to her by Sultan Abdulaziz.

Issue
Perestu had no children her own, but adopted a son and daughter of Abdülmejid when they lost their mothers:
Abdülhamid II (21 September 1842 - 10 February 1918). His Natural mother was Tirimüjgan Kadın, dead in 1852. 34th Sultan of the Ottoman Empire.
Cemile Sultan (17 August 1843 - 26 February 1915). Her Natural mother was Düzdidil Hanım, dead in 1845. She married once and had three sons and three daughters.

As Valide Sultan
After Abdul Hamid II ascended the throne in 1876, she was given the position of Valide Sultan, title due to the mother of the sultan, by him, and headed the harem. Perestu was the first woman to have this title without being the sultan's biological mother, and the last woman in history to bear it, since both Mehmed V and Mehmed VI, the last two Ottoman sultans, were orphans on their ascent to the throne. Abdul Hamid told her categorically not to involve herself in politics. Thus, unlike many of her predecessors, she was not active in politics, because, although he valued his adoptive mother, he believed that the excessive interference of the previous Valide Sultans in politics had damaged the Empire.

In 1879 she interceded with Abdulhamid on behalf of his half-sister Mediha Sultan and her adoptive mother Verdicenan Kadin. Princess Mediha wanted to marry the man she was in love with instead of accepting an arranged marriage, and she sought the help of the Valide Sultan in presenting her request to the sultan. Abdulhamid accepted the request.

Three days before Abdul Hamid became Sultan, he went to Perestu's villa and kissed her hand, acknowledging her as his Valide Sultan, and it was from there that he proceeded to Topkapı Palace for the ceremony of homage at his accession. Perestu loved this house. Now and again she would want to go there, but because Abdul Hamid absolutely wanted her present in the palace he would withhold permission.

In 1885, during the visit of King Oscar II and Queen Sophia of Sweden to the Ottoman Empire, she received the Swedish queen, who was allowed to visit the Imperial harem. 

The internal matters of the palace were in her charge. But she did not want to hurt anyone's feelings in the least, did not interfere in the matters, sought justice and equity, and because she was firmly religious she passed a good deal of time in prayers. She possessed good, high moral standards, which led her to help the poor and needy.

Abdul Hamid particularly wanted Perestu to attend the Royal Mosque Procession every Friday. Sometimes after the ceremony she would secretly slip out to her villa, but when Abdul Hamid learned of it, he immediately aided set off from the palace with a carriage and brought her back.

In 1891, Perestu commissioned a fountain (sebil) in Bala Tekkesi, Silivrikapı and another fountain (çeşme) in the same place in 1895.

Death

Perestu died in 1906 at the age of approximately seventy-four in her villa located at Maçka, Istanbul. The traditional service at which the Prophet's Nativity Poem is recited was held in her memory at the Shaziliya Dervish Convent and at the Yıldız Hamidiye Mosque. She lies at rest in the mausoleum of Mihrişah Valide Sultan in Eyüp, Istanbul.

Honours 
 Order of the House of Osman
 Order of Charity
 Order of the Medjidie

In literature and popular culture

Perestu Kadın is a character in Hıfzı Topuz's historical novel Abdülmecit: İmparatorluk Çökerken Sarayda 22 Yıl: Roman (2009).

Perestu Kadın is a character in Tim Symonds' historical novel Sherlock Holmes and The Sword of Osman (2015).

In the 2017 TV series Payitaht: Abdülhamid, Perestu Kadın is portrayed by Turkish actress Şefika Ümit Tolun.

See also

Kadın (title)
Valide sultan
List of consorts of the Ottoman sultans
Ottoman Imperial Harem

References

Sources

Further reading

External links

 WOMEN IN POWER 1870-1900

1830 births
1904 deaths
Ubykh people
Valide sultan
People from the Ottoman Empire of Circassian descent
Muslims from the Ottoman Empire
Abdul Hamid II
Consorts of Abdulmejid I